Ubume (Japanese) – Ghosts of women who died in childbirth
 Uchek Langmeidong (Meitei mythology) – Semi human, semi hornbill creature 
 Uma-no-ashi (Japanese) – Horse's leg which dangles from a tree and kicks passersby
 Umibōzu (Japanese) – Ghost of drowned priest
 Umi-nyōbō (Japanese) – Female sea monster who steals fish
 Undead (Worldwide) – Dead that behave as if alive 
 Underwater panther (Native American) – Feline water spirit
Undine (Alchemy) – Water elemental
 Unhcegila (Lakota) – Dragon 
 Unicorn (Medieval Bestiaries) – Horse-like creature with the legs of an antelope, the tail of a lion and a single magical healing horn.
 Unktehi (Lakota) – Serpentine rain spirit
 Unktehila (Lakota) – Reptilian water monster
 Upinis (Lithuanian) – River spirit
 Ur (Mandaean) – King of the World of Darkness, often portrayed as a dragon or snake
 Urayuli (Native American) – Hairy giant
Uriaș (Romanian) – Giant
Urmahlullu (Mesopotamian) – Lion-human hybrid guardian spirit
 Ushi-oni (Japanese) – Bull-headed monster
 Utukku (Akkadian) – ″Underworld messenger spirit″
 Uwan (Japanese) – Spirit that shouts to surprise people

U